The 2018–2020 CAVB Beach Volleyball Continental Cup were a beach volleyball double-gender event. Teams representing African countries were split into groups of four, where an elimination bracket determined the 2 teams to advance to the next stage from the sub-zones. The winners of the event qualified for the 2020 Summer Olympics.

Men

First round

Pool 1
 Pool 1 was contested in Tunis, Tunisia.

|}

Final Ranking
 1. 
 2. 
 Tunisia qualified for second round of CAVB Beach Continental Cup.

Pool 2
 Pool 2 was contested in Kololi, Gambia.

|}

Final Ranking
 1. 
 2. 
 3. 
 4. 
 Gambia and Sierra Leone qualified for second round of CAVB Beach Continental Cup.

Pool 3
 Pool 3 was contested in Accra, Ghana.

|}
Final Ranking
 1. 
 2. 
 3. 

 Ghana and Togo qualified for second round of CAVB Beach Continental Cup.

Pool 4
 Pool 4 was contested in Kinshasa, Democratic Republic of the Congo.

|}
Final Ranking
 1. 
 2. 
 3. 

 Congo and Democratic Republic of the Congo qualified for second round of CAVB Beach Continental Cup.

Pool 5
 Pool 5 was contested in Entebbe, Uganda.

|}

Final Ranking
 1. 
 2. 
 3. 
 4. 
 Tanzania and Kenya qualified for second round of CAVB Beach Continental Cup.

Pool 6
 Pool 6 was contested in Massawa, Eritrea.

|}
Final Ranking
 1. 
 2. 
 3. 
 4. 

 Rwanda and Egypt qualified for second round of CAVB Beach Continental Cup.

Pool 7
 Pool 7 was contested in Flic-en-Flac, Mauritius.

|}

Final Ranking
 1. 
 2. 
 Mauritius qualified for second round of CAVB Beach Continental Cup.

Pool 8 & 9
 Pool 8 & 9 was contested in Maputo, Mozambique.

|}
Final Ranking
Pool 8
 1. 
 2. 
 3. 
 Mozambique and Zambia qualified for second round of CAVB Beach Continental Cup.

Pool 9
 1. 
 2. 
 3. 
 South Africa and Botswana qualified for second round of CAVB Beach Continental Cup

Second round

Pool C
 Pool C was contested in Banjul, The Gambia.

|}

Final Ranking
 1. 
 2. 
 3.  (withdraw)
 4.  (withdraw)
 5.  (withdraw)
 Gambia and South Sudan qualified for final round of CAVB Beach Continental Cup.

Final Round

Women

First round

Pool 3
 Pool 3 was contested in Accra, Ghana.

|}
Final Ranking
 1. 
 2. 
 3. 
 Nigeria and Ghana qualified for second round of CAVB Beach Continental Cup.

Pool 4
 Pool 4 was contested in Kinshasa, Democratic Republic of the Congo.

|}
Final Ranking
 1. 
 2. 
 Democratic Republic of the Congo qualified for second round of CAVB Beach Continental Cup.

Pool 6
 Pool 6 was contested in Dar es Salaam, Tanzania.

|}
Final Ranking
 1. 
 2. 
 3. 
 4. 
 Rwanda and Kenya qualified for second round of CAVB Beach Continental Cup.

Pool 7
 Pool 7 was contested in Massawa, Eritrea.

|}
Final Ranking
 1. 
 2. 
 3. 
 4. 
 Egypt and Sudan qualified for second round of CAVB Beach Continental Cup.

Pool 8
 Pool 8 was contested in Flic-en-Flac, Mauritius.

|}

Final Ranking
 1. 
 2. 
 Mauritius qualified for second round of CAVB Beach Continental Cup.

Pool 9 & 10
 Pool 9 & 10 was contested in Maputo, Mozambique.

|}
Final Ranking
Pool 9
 1. 
 2. 
 3. 
 Mozambique and South Africa qualified for second round of CAVB Beach Continental Cup.

Pool 10
 1. 
 2. 
 3. 
 Zambia and Zimbabwe qualified for second round of CAVB Beach Continental Cup.

Second round

Pool C
 Pool C was contested in Abuja, Nigeria.

|}

Final Ranking
 1. 
 2. 
 3.  (withdraw)
 4.  (withdraw)
 5.  (withdraw)
 Nigeria and Zambia qualified for final round of CAVB Beach Continental Cup.

Pool D
 Pool D was contested in Entebbe, Uganda.

|}

Final Ranking
 1. 
 2. 
 3. 
 4. 
 5. 
 Egypt and Mozambique qualified for final round of CAVB Beach Continental Cup.

Final Round

References

External links
Official website

Continental Beach Volleyball Cup
2018 in beach volleyball
2019 in beach volleyball
2020 in beach volleyball